Erlang may refer to:

Science and technology
 Erlang (programming language), a programming language
 Erlang (unit), a unit to measure traffic in telecommunications or other domains
 Erlang distribution, a probability distribution describing the time between events

Transport
 Erlang station, metro station in Chongqing, China
 Erlang railway station, on the Chinese Qinghai–Tibet Railway

Places
 Mount Erlang, a mountain in China

Other uses
 Agner Krarup Erlang (1878–1929), mathematician and engineer after whom several concepts are named
 Erlang Shen, a Chinese deity

See also
 Erlangen, Germany
 Erlanger (disambiguation)